Andreas Gloerfeld (born 10 August 1948) is a German athlete. He competed in the men's long jump at the 1972 Summer Olympics.

References

1948 births
Living people
Athletes (track and field) at the 1972 Summer Olympics
German male long jumpers
Olympic athletes of West Germany
Place of birth missing (living people)